The 2004 Swedish Rally (formally the 53rd Uddeholm Swedish Rally) was the second round of the 2004 World Rally Championship. The race was held over three days between 6 February and 8 February 2004, and was based in Hagfors, Sweden. Citroën's Sébastien Loeb won the race, his 6th win in the World Rally Championship.

Background

Entry list

Itinerary
All dates and times are CET (UTC+1).

Results

Overall

World Rally Cars

Classification

Special stages

Championship standings

Production World Rally Championship

Classification

Special stages

Championship standings

References

External links 
 Official website of the World Rally Championship
 2004 Swedish Rally at Rallye-info 
 Results at eWRC.com

Sweden
Swedish Rally
Rally